IBM 8514 is a graphics card manufactured by IBM and introduced with the IBM PS/2 line of personal computers in 1987. However, IBM sold the companion CRT monitor (for use with the 8514/A) which carries the same designation, 8514.

The 8514 uses a standardised programming interface called the "Adapter Interface" or AI. This interface is also used by XGA, IBM Image Adapter/A, and clones of the 8514/A and XGA such as the ATI Technologies Mach 32 and IIT AGX. The interface allows computer software to offload common 2D-drawing operations (line-draw, color-fill, and block copies via a blitter) onto the 8514 hardware. This frees the host CPU for other tasks, and greatly improves the speed of redrawing a graphics visual (such as a pie-chart or CAD-illustration).

The 8514/A required a Micro Channel architecture bus at a time when ISA systems were standard.

History
The 8514 was introduced with the IBM PS/2 computers in April 1987. It was an optional upgrade to the Micro Channel architecture based PS/2's Video Graphics Array (VGA), and was delivered within three months of PS/2's introduction.

Although not the first PC video card to support hardware acceleration, IBM's 8514 is often credited as the first PC mass-market fixed-function accelerator. Up until the 8514's introduction, PC graphics acceleration was relegated to expensive workstation-class, graphics coprocessor boards. Coprocessor boards (such as the TARGA Truevision series) were designed around special CPU or digital signal processor chips which were programmable. Fixed-function accelerators, such as the 8514, sacrificed programmability for better cost/performance ratio.

Later compatible 8514 boards were based on the Texas Instruments TMS34010 chip.

Even though the 8514 was not a best-seller, it created a market for fixed-function PC graphics accelerators which grew exponentially in the early 1990s. 

The ATI Mach 8 and Mach 32 chips were popular clones, and several companies (notably S3) designed graphics accelerator chips which were not register compatible but were conceptually very similar to the 8514/A.

The 8514 was superseded by IBM XGA. 

The VESA Group introduced a common standardized way to access features like hardware cursors, Bit Block transfers (Bit Blt), off screen sprites, hardware panning, drawing and other functions with VBE/accelerator functions (VBE/AF) in August 1996.

Software support
Software that supported this graphic standard:

OS/2
Windows 2.1
Windows 3.x
Windows 95
XFree86 2.1.1
AutoCAD 10
QuikMenu
Any BGI software using IBM8514.BGI

Output capabilities
The 8514 offered:
 in 256 colors out of 262,144 (18 bit RGB)
 in 256 colors out of 262,144
 text mode with 80×34 characters
 text mode with 85×38 characters
 text mode with 146×51 characters

Latter clone board offered additional resolutions:
 with 16-bit and 24-bit color depths
 with 16-bit and 24-bit color depths

Clones
In the late 1980s, several companies cloned the 8514/A often for the ISA bus. Notable among those was Western Digital Imaging's PWGA-1 (also known as the WD9500 chip set), the Chips & Technologies 82C480, and ATI's Mach 8 and later Mach 32 chips. In one way or another, the clones were all better than the original with more speed, enhanced drawing functionality and overall improved video mode selections. Clone support for non-interlaced modes at resolutions like 800×600 and 1280×1024 was typical, and all clones had longer command queues for increased performance.

ATI Technologies: the Mach8, Mach32, Graphics Vantage and 8514/Ultra
Chips and Technologies: F82C480 B EIZO - AA40 and F82C481 Miro Magic Plus
Matrox: MG-108
Paradise Systems: Plus-A, Renaissance Rendition II
Desktop Computing: AGA 1024
NEC: Multisync Graphics Engine
IIT AGX and Tseng Labs ET4000 are also referenced as being IBM 8514 compatible.

See also
List of IBM products
List of defunct graphics chips and card companies

References

Further reading

 Guide to the IBM 8514a
 8514 Hardware

Computer display standards
8514
Graphics cards
Products introduced in 1987
8514